The Musée Rude is an art museum dedicated to the French sculptor François Rude (1784–1855). It has the "Musée de France" label and has been housed since 1947 in a part of the former Église Saint-Étienne of Dijon, built during the 11th century. The museum displays life-size plaster casts acquired by the Dijon municipality between 1887 and 1910, which are major works by the artist exhibited in other museums in France (including the Louvre in Paris). The museum also displays archaeological crypt of the 11th century and the former St. Stephen's Gate of the Dijon castrum of the 3rd century on which the church is built. Open from 9:30 am to 6 pm from 1 June to 30 September, the museum is free.

Works

External links
 Musée Rude, on the Dijon site

Art museums and galleries in France
Art museums established in 1947
Museums in Dijon
1947 establishments in France